The Sikorsky S-34 was a 1920s American six-seat sesquiplane, designed and built by the Sikorsky Manufacturing Corporation. Only one was built, but the design led to the successful Sikorsky S-38.

Design and development
The S-34 was a sesquiplane amphibian with a boat hull, being powered by two tractor  Wright Whirlwind J-4 engines. It had a boom-mounted twin-rudder tail unit and room inside the hull for five passengers. During a test flight in November 1927, one engine failed and the S-34 crashed and sank. Igor Sikorksy and the others on board escaped without injury but the S-34 was destroyed. It was the first Sikorsky aircraft with a boat hull and would lead to a family of similar flying boats and amphibians.

Specifications

See also

References

1920s United States civil utility aircraft
S-034
Flying boats
Sesquiplanes
Aircraft first flown in 1926
Twin piston-engined tractor aircraft